Ross James Kemp  (born 21 July 1964) is an English actor, author, and television presenter. He rose to prominence in the role of Grant Mitchell in the BBC soap opera EastEnders. He is also known for his other roles as Graham Lodsworth in Emmerdale and Birds of a Feather as Detective Inspector Monk. Kemp has received international recognition as a reporter for presenting the BAFTA Award-winning documentary television series Ross Kemp on Gangs (2004–2009).

Early life
Kemp was born on 21 July 1964 in Barking, Essex. His mother Jean was a hairdresser and his father John was a detective superintendent in the Metropolitan Police. His maternal great-grandfather was a sub-organist at Chichester Cathedral for many years. He has one brother, Darren, who is a filmmaker for the BBC. Kemp attended Shenfield High School and the Webber Douglas Academy.

Acting career

Early career
After training at Webber Douglas Academy of Dramatic Art, Kemp received his Equity card when appearing alongside John Thaw and Richard Wilson at the Palace Theatre, Westcliff-on-Sea.

Kemp went on to feature in training films for the Ministry of Defence and the ITV soap opera Emmerdale Farm (now Emmerdale) as Graham Lodsworth. Guest appearances in London's Burning and Birds of a Feather followed, before he had a minor role in the 1987 film Playing Away alongside Neil Morrissey.

In 1990, Kemp appeared in an edition of the Anglia Television police drama The Chief. The episode, entitled Call Sign Bravo, saw Kemp play the role of Police Constable Dennis Scovell. Around the same time he also starred in a golf themed advert for Kellogg's Fruit & Fibre cereal.

EastEnders
Kemp's best-known role is that of hardman Grant Mitchell in the BBC soap opera EastEnders. Making his debut in February 1990, his character quickly became part of the soap’s key storylines during the 1990s, particularly troubled marriages to Sharon Watts (Letitia Dean) and then Tiffany Mitchell (Martine McCutcheon), as well as the "Sharongate" storyline, which saw brother Phil Mitchell (Steve McFadden) having an affair with Grant's wife, which was uncovered two years after it began.

Kemp announced on 24 March 1999 that he would be leaving the soap later that year after nearly 10 years. His exit was aired in October 1999 when his character moved to Brazil after surviving a car crash. Kemp refused to rule out an eventual return to EastEnders, and various media reports over the next few years speculated that he would return to the series at some stage. In early 2005, the BBC confirmed that Kemp would be returning to EastEnders in the autumn of that year after six years away. It was co-star Barbara Windsor who convinced him to return, even though his comeback would only be a relatively brief one. His first comeback lasted just a few weeks from October 2005, but he returned again in March 2006, before departing once again in June that year.

In January 2016, it was confirmed that Kemp would make a brief return to the show for the death of Grant's on-screen mother, Peggy Mitchell (played by Windsor), appearing in three episodes during May of that year. He later filmed a further three weeks and returned again for brief stints from 4 July to 9 September 2016.

Other roles
Following his initial departure from EastEnders, Kemp moved from the BBC to ITV for a reported £1.2 million two-year deal. Kemp's first role for ITV was in Hero of the Hour. During its filming, on 27 October 1999, Kemp required hospital treatment after being shot in the face when a stunt went wrong. He suffered cuts to his chest and face after safety glass shattered, and was also hit in the face by the discharge from a blank round. He was treated at the scene by paramedics and made a full recovery.

In 2000, Kemp starred in ITV's A Christmas Carol. He took the lead roles in the television series Without Motive and In Defence in 2000, and in 2002's Ultimate Force, where he played Army Staff sergeant Henry Garvie from the British Special Air Service. He continued to appear in this role until 2006. He also played "Cirra" in the 2004 TV film, Spartacus.

In 2005, Kemp appeared in an episode of BBC's Extras and in a two-part adaptation of the Gerald Seymour novel A Line in the Sand for ITV. He has also presented on The Friday Night Project and appeared as a stand in host on The Paul O'Grady Show (2007, 2008).

Kemp appeared in the 4th episode of Series 14 of BBC's motoring show Top Gear. He was the "Man in Boot" of a Renault Twingo Sport being tested by Jeremy Clarkson. The test ended with Clarkson driving the car off the quayside of Belfast Harbour, after which Clarkson joked that Kemp had been killed. Kemp also appeared in Series 1, where he did a 1 minute 54 seconds (wet) in the "Star in a Reasonably Priced Car" segment.

In 2022, Kemp began presenting the game show Bridge of Lies, airing on weekdays on BBC One, as well as a series of celebrity specials broadcast on Saturday evenings. Kemp told the The Sunday Post: "I am the last person that should be hosting a game show, but it seems to work [...] the landscape of TV has changed significantly in the last six, seven years. Actors once upon a time didn’t do commercials, now A-listers do them. If you worked in television, you couldn’t be in movies or if you were in movies you’d never touch TV [...] that snobbery I would suggest is dissolving. And that’s got to be a good thing I guess."

Documentary presenter 
In 2004, Kemp filmed Ross Kemp on Gangs. He followed this up with the documentaries Ross Kemp in Afghanistan, Ross Kemp in Search of Pirates, Ross Kemp: Battle for the Amazon and Ross Kemp: Extreme World.

Writing
Kemp has written several books. Initially focusing on tie-ins to his various TV documentaries, 2011 saw the publication of his first fictional story, Devil to Pay. A novel, Moving Target, was released in summer 2012.

Politics
In 1999, Kemp was elected as Rector of the University of Glasgow as the candidate of the Glasgow University Labour Club but did not attend local meetings. In October 2000 the Glasgow University Students' Representative Council passed a motion requesting him to resign, and within weeks he did. Kemp was the first rector in 50 years to leave the position prematurely and was succeeded by Scottish actor Greg Hemphill.

In August 2014, Kemp was one of 200 public figures who were signatories to a letter to The Guardian opposing Scottish independence in the run-up to September's referendum on that issue.

In June 2017, Kemp endorsed the Labour Party at the 2017 UK general election, and took part in campaigning for Labour candidates.

In 2022, Kemp declared his support for a "National Thank You Day" to celebrate the Platinum Jubilee of Elizabeth II.

Personal life
On 11 June 2002, Kemp married Rebekah Wade, the then editor of The Sun. In November 2005, Wade was arrested following an alleged assault on her husband. Kemp refused medical attention for a swollen lip and no action was taken. In March 2009 Kemp and Wade divorced, and in October 2010, Kemp fathered a boy with his partner, Nicola Coleman, who was his make-up artist.

Kemp married Australian Renee O'Brien in 2012. They have three children.

Filmography

Stage credits

Awards

References

External links

 

1964 births
Living people
20th-century English male actors
21st-century English male actors
Alumni of the Webber Douglas Academy of Dramatic Art
BAFTA winners (people)
British monarchists
English male film actors
English male soap opera actors
English television presenters
English war correspondents
Labour Party (UK) people
Male actors from Essex
People from Barking, London
Rectors of the University of Glasgow
Television personalities from Essex